Phil Doyle (born 1967) is an Australian writer, poet and journalist.

Doyle's debut play After The Rain, was performed at Melbourne's Organ Factory Theatre. In 1998 mergemedia released his novella A Book About Things That Didn't Happen. In 1999 he was the ACT finalist in Radio JJJ's Raw Comedy competition.

Publications that have featured Doyle's work include: Overland, dB, AWU NSW, The Big Issue magazines, and The Age.

References

Australian political journalists
Australian columnists
Australian sportswriters
Australian poets
20th-century Australian novelists
20th-century Australian male writers
Australian male novelists
Australian trade unionists
People from the Blue Mountains (New South Wales)
Living people
1967 births
Australian male poets
Date of birth missing (living people)
Place of birth missing (living people)